Tom André Hilde (born 22 September 1987) is a Norwegian former ski jumper.

Career 
Having first competed with the Norwegian World Cup team in 2006, he won two silver medals in the team large hill event at the FIS Nordic World Ski Championships (2007, 2009).

Hilde also won a bronze medal in the team event at the FIS Ski Flying World Championships 2008 in Oberstdorf. Hilde currently holds five World Cup victories in all events since 2007. His best overall world cup result is a fourth place in the 2007/2008 season. Hilde currently lives in Lillehammer, Norway.

World Cup

Standings

Wins

References 

1987 births
Living people
Norwegian male ski jumpers
People from Asker
Ski jumpers at the 2010 Winter Olympics
Olympic ski jumpers of Norway
Olympic bronze medalists for Norway
Olympic medalists in ski jumping
FIS Nordic World Ski Championships medalists in ski jumping
Medalists at the 2010 Winter Olympics
Sportspeople from Viken (county)
21st-century Norwegian people